Percy John Ebdon (16 March 1874 – 16 February 1943) was an English sportsman who made two international rugby union appearances for England, and made two first-class cricket appearances for Somerset in 1894.

As a rugby player, Ebdon was a second row forward. England lost both the international matches he played in during the 1896-97 season, once to Wales and once to Ireland.

References

External links
 
 

1874 births
1943 deaths
English cricketers
Somerset cricketers
England international rugby union players
English rugby union players
Rugby union players from Somerset